History of Consciousness is the name of a department in the Humanities Division of the University of California, Santa Cruz with a 50+ year history of interdisciplinary research and student training in "established and emergent disciplines and fields" in the humanities, arts, sciences, and social sciences based on a diverse array of theoretical approaches. The program has a history of well-known affiliated faculty and of well-known program graduates.

History
The program was started in the first year of the Santa Cruz campus in a rather informal manner. A small group of faculty members, including the American historian Page Smith, philosopher Maurice Natanson, culture theorist Harry Berger, Jr., and psychology professor Bert Kaplan approached the
University of California system-wide Graduate Council with a proposal for a new type of graduate program for the new campus. According to the founding Chancellor of the campus, Dean McHenry, they did not consult with him and the program was approved without his input.

For over a decade, there were no direct faculty appointments to the program and all faculty teaching in the program was done by members of established Boards of Studies (at the time, the UC Santa Cruz equivalent of departments). This led to problems in budgeting and program continuity, and coupled with the unorthodox interdisciplinary nature of the program, it also presented challenges in placing History of Consciousness graduates in teaching jobs. The appointment of Norman O. Brown as Professor of Humanities in 1968 was in part intended to address some of these concerns.

The first graduate student in History of Consciousness was Harvey Rabbin. Perhaps the best-known graduate of the program is Huey P. Newton, co-founder of the Black Panther Party. Newton received his Ph.D. in 1980.

Faculty

Historians Hayden White and James Clifford were among the first faculty members directly appointed to the department. White joined the faculty as Professor of History of Consciousness and Chair of the Board in July, 1978, having been recruited by then-Chancellor Angus Taylor to bring stability to the program.

In addition to White and Clifford, Angela Davis, Barbara Epstein, Donna Haraway, Stephen Heath, Fredric Jameson, Teresa de Lauretis and Gary Lease joined the program, while professors in other disciplines taught "HistCon" courses, supervised HistCon graduate students, and participated in new graduate student admissions. Among those most active at this time were political theorists J. Peter Euben, Robert Meister and John Schaar as well as philosopher David Hoy. Other notable faculty who have taught in the program include Karen Barad, Victor Burgin, Isaac Julien, Herbert Marcuse, David Marriott, Kobena Mercer, Gayatri Chakravorty Spivak and Neferti Tadiar.

As of November 2021, the department's faculty include Banu Bargu, Chris Connery, Carla Freccero, Robert Meister, Eric Porter, and Massimiliano Tomba. In 2018, Gopal Balakrishnan was the subject of an investigation regarding his violation of the university's sexual harassment policy. He was ultimately found guilty of violating it and was fired from the university.

Notable graduates

William Drea Adams
Bettina Aptheker
Joanne Barker
Thomas Bass
Julian Bleecker
Lisa E. Bloom
Greg Calvert
Ron Eglash
S. Lochlann Jain
Caren Kaplan
Noelani Goodyear-Ka'opua
J. Kēhaulani Kauanui
Carol Mavor
Stephen Nachmanovitch
Huey P. Newton
Marisa Olson
Mike Rotkin
Chela Sandoval
Ruth Frankenberg
Claudia Castaneda
Kevin Fellezs
Katie King
Andrea Smith
Sandy Stone
Marita Sturken
Kim TallBear
Adam Geary
Eva Hayward
Luz Calvo
Teresia Teaiwa
Michael Tobias
Howard Winant

Gurbhagat Singh

See also

Critical race theory
Feminist theory
Film theory
Marxism and anarchism
Philosophy
Psychoanalysis
Political economy
Postmodernism
Science studies
Social movements
Visual culture

References

Further reading

External links
 
 
 
 
  Regarding the perception of the program by its campus administration, as of 2009.

University of California, Santa Cruz
Critical theory
1965 establishments in California
Graduate schools in the United States